Euchloe daphalis is a butterfly of the family Pieridae. It is found in the western Pamirs, northern Afghanistan, Pakistan and India. It is found on arid slopes up to heights of 2,500 to 3,000 meters.

Adults are on wing from June to July.

External links
Russian Insects

Euchloe
Butterflies described in 1865
Butterflies of Asia
Taxa named by Frederic Moore